Brad Williamson (born 27 June 1981) is an Australian professional basketball player who is most known for his time spent in the National Basketball League (NBL) playing for the Brisbane Bullets and Townsville Crocodiles. In 2007, he won an NBL Championship with the Bullets.

Williamson's first senior season came in 1998 playing for the Maroochydore Clippers of the QABL, and continued to play for them until 2003, winning club MVP from 1999 to 2003. With the Clippers, he won the inaugural Southern Cross Division title in 1999, was the ABA's steals leader with 4.13 per game in 2003, and earned co-MVP and Co-Youth Player of the year honours in 2003. In 2004, he moved to the Brisbane Capitals. Then from 2005 to 2008, he played for the Southern Districts Spartans (now known as the Brisbane Spartans). In 2010, he played for the Caboolture Suns. In 2011, he played for the Ipswich Force. Then in 2012 and 2013, he played for the Rockhampton Rockets, and with a potent starting line up of Stephen Weigh, Michael Kingma, Justin Watts, Mitch Philp and himself, the Rockets won the 2013 QBL Championship. In 2014, he returned to Rockhampton where he won his second QBL Championship in two years. He again played for Rockhampton in 2015 and averaged 15.3 points in 17 games. After a season away from the QBL in 2016, Williamson joined the Sunshine Coast Phoenix for the 2017 season.

References

External links
QBL player profile
NBL stats
2007 SEABL stats
2008 SEABL stats

1981 births
Living people
Australian men's basketball players
Basketball players from Brisbane
Brisbane Bullets players
Shooting guards
Small forwards
Townsville Crocodiles players